Ilyinskoye is a rural locality (a village) in Vologodsky District, Vologda Oblast, Russia. The population was 12 as of 2002.

Geography 
The distance to Vologda is 64.6 km, to Nepotyagovo is 31 km. Kruglitsa, Nikitino, Pochinok, Krugolka, Yepifanka, Norobovo and Dovodchikovo are the nearest rural localities.

References 

Rural localities in Vologodsky District